Aglionby may be the surname of:

Edward Aglionby (died c. 1591) (1520–c. 1591), MP for Carlisle, and for Warwick, and poet
Edward Aglionby (died 1553), MP for Carlisle
Edward Aglionby (died 1599), MP for Carlisle
Hugh Aglionby, MP
John Aglionby (divine), died ca. 1610
John Aglionby (bishop), Bishop of Accra from 1924 to 1951
John Aglionby (MP), MP from 1553 to 1559

As a placename it may refer to:
Aglionby, Cumbria, England